The 1995 Trans America Athletic Conference men's basketball tournament (now known as the ASUN men's basketball tournament) was held March 2–4 at the UCF Arena in Orlando, Florida.

Eighth-seeded  upset  in the championship game, 68–57, to win their first TAAC/Atlantic Sun men's basketball tournament. FIU became the first team in the history of the TAAC/Atlantic Sun tournament to win the tournament as the lowest-seeded team in the field.

The Golden Panthers, therefore, received the TAAC's automatic bid to the 1995 NCAA tournament, their first Division I tournament appearance.

Even though the TAAC added one more team for the 1994–95 season (Campbell), the tournament field remained fixed at eight. Along with Campbell, fellow newcomers College of Charleston (who won the TAAC regular season title) and Florida Atlantic were not part of the final bracket.

Bracket

References

ASUN men's basketball tournament
Tournament
TAAC men's basketball tournament
TAAC men's basketball tournament